Farrukh Dustov was the defending champion was beaten in the Second Round by Yuichi Sugita.
Grega Žemlja won the title, defeating Wu Di 6–3, 6–0 in the final.

Seeds

Draw

Finals

Top half

Bottom half

References
 Main Draw
 Qualifying Draw

Beijing International Challenger - Singles
2012 Men's Singles